John Crombie (1789–1872) was a minister of the Church of Scotland, who served as Moderator of the General Assembly in 1856.

Life

He was born in 1789 the son of Francis Crombie a schoolteacher and his wife, Jean Fair. He studied at St Andrews University graduating MA in 1822.

He was ordained at St Andrew's Scots Church in London in January 1819. Whilst in London St Andrews University awarded him an honorary Doctor of Divinity in 1832. He translated to Aberlemno in September 1841. Staying in the established church in the Disruption of 1843 he translated to Scone (near Perth) in March 1844.

In 1856 he succeeded Andrew Bell of Linlithgow as Moderator of the General Assembly of the Church of Scotland the highest position in the Scottish Church. He was succeeded in turn by James Robertson.

He died on 4 December 1872.

Family
In October 1827 he married Frances Liddle (d.1850) of St Dunstan's in Stepney. They has several children:
Frances (b.1833)
Jean (b.1835)
Isabella Christie Crombie (b.1840) married Rev John Martin of Bonhill died in Welshpool in Australia
John Liddle Crombie (1842-1920) doctor in North Berwick
Louisa Crombie (1844-1920) died in Perth

Publications
Statistical Account of Aberlemno (1845)
The Character and Offices of Christ

References
 

1789 births
1872 deaths
Alumni of the University of St Andrews
Moderators of the General Assembly of the Church of Scotland